Novosyolovka is a rural locality (a selo) in Kiprinsky Selsoviet, Shelabolikhinsky District, Altai Krai, Russia. The population was 40 as of 2013. There are 3 streets.

Geography 
Novosyolovka is located 36 km west of Shelabolikha (the district's administrative centre) by road. Omutskoye is the nearest rural locality.

References 

Rural localities in Shelabolikhinsky District